The Scope may refer to:
 The Scope (alternative weekly), a newspaper published in St. John's, Newfoundland and Labrador, Canada
 CJRU, a campus radio station at Ryerson University in Toronto
 Norfolk Scope, a multi-function complex in Norfolk, Virginia
 The Scope, the blog of the Yale Scientific Magazine